Karaiyappalaiyur  is a village in the Kudavasal taluk of Tiruvarur district in Tamil Nadu, India.

Demographics 

As per the 2001 census, Kappanamangalam had a population of 1,181 with 617 males and 564 females. The sex ratio was 914. The literacy rate was 70.74.

References 

 

Villages in Tiruvarur district